Simon Ungers (May 8, 1957 – March 6, 2006) was a German architect and artist.

Simon Ungers was born in 1957 in Cologne, the son of the architect Oswald Mathias Ungers and Liselotte Gable. In 1969, his family moved to the United States. From 1975 to 1980, he studied architecture at Cornell University in Ithaca, New York.

Ungers worked in New York and Cologne. He gained attention together with Tom Kinslow for the construction of T-House, a home made of Cor-ten in Wilton, New York. He also designed the Cube House in Ithaca, New York.

In 1995, he was one of two first-prize winners in a competition to design the Holocaust Memorial in Berlin, but in a tie-breaker vote his design was not selected.  Later neither of the two winning designs was chosen, but a new competition was held.

Ungers taught at Harvard University, Syracuse University, Rensselaer Polytechnic Institute, Cornell University and University of Maryland, College Park.

Ungers committed suicide in Hürth, Germany on March 6, 2006, after a long-term battle with mental illness.  He was 48 years old. He is survived by his wife, Janet O'Hair.

References

External links
Simon Ungers website

1957 births
2006 deaths
Cornell University College of Architecture, Art, and Planning alumni
Cornell University faculty
20th-century German architects
German emigrants to the United States
Harvard University faculty
University of Maryland, College Park faculty